The Odisha Gana Parishad (Odisha Popular Association), was an Indian political party in the Indian state of Odisha, a splinter group of Biju Janata Dal. The party was founded on October 29, 2000. The president of OGP was Bijoy Mohapatra. Mahapatra had been expelled from BJD in February 2000. Mahapatra had come into conflict with BJD leader Navin Patnaik over the election of Dilip Ray to the Rajya Sabha.

In the 2004 elections, OGP was allied with Indian National Congress. OGP had four candidates to the Odisha state legislative assembly, out of whom two got elected.

The student wing of OGP was called Orissa Chhatra Parishad.

In 2007, OGP merged with Nationalist Congress Party.

References

Political parties in Odisha
Defunct political parties in Odisha
2000 establishments in Orissa
Political parties established in 2000
Political parties disestablished in 2007
2007 disestablishments in India